Engleria is a genus of African flowering plants in the family Asteraceae.

 Species
 Engleria africana O.Hoffm. - Namibia 
 Engleria decumbens (Welw. ex Hiern) Hiern - Namibia, Angola

References

Asteraceae genera
Flora of Southern Africa
Astereae